Ansbach is a city in Bavaria, Germany.

Ansbach may also refer to:

Ansbach (district), in Bavaria, Germany
Ansbach (electoral district), constituency in Bavaria, Germany
Principality of Ansbach, principality of the Holy Roman Empire
Ansbach (automobile), German automobile
Ansbach (Usa), river of Hesse, Germany

See also
Anspach (disambiguation)